Miyagase Fuku Dam  is a gravity dam located in Kanagawa Prefecture in Japan. The dam is used for flood control, water supply and power production. The catchment area of the dam is 1.1 km2. The dam impounds about 4  ha of land when full and can store 557 thousand cubic meters of water. The construction of the dam was started on 1971 and completed in 2000.

See also
List of dams in Japan

References

Dams in Kanagawa Prefecture